The California Theatre of the Performing Arts or simply referred to as the California Theatre is a performing arts center in the historic Downtown area of San Bernardino, California.  Originally a part of the Fox Theatre chain, it opened in 1928. It still houses its original Wurlitzer Style 216 pipe organ.  It was also the site of the last performance by Will Rogers prior to his death, in a 1935 plane crash.

In the early years of Hollywood, filmmakers would test-screen their movies at the California Theatre. Classic films such as "King Kong" and "The Wizard of Oz" were first seen by audiences at the theatre in the 1930s.

The theatre is managed by Theatrical Arts International, the largest theatre company in the Inland Empire, which presents Broadway tours from the national touring circuit, and has hosted the San Bernardino Symphony since 1929. The theatre has recently hosted the tapings of Showtime's "The Latin Divas of Comedy", and "The Payaso Comedy Slam".

References

External links
official California Theatre website
San Bernardino Symphony home page

Performing arts centers in California
Buildings and structures in San Bernardino, California
Cinemas and movie theaters in California
Event venues established in 1928
National Register of Historic Places in San Bernardino County, California
Theatres on the National Register of Historic Places in California
Tourist attractions in San Bernardino, California
Mission Revival architecture in California
1928 establishments in California
History of San Bernardino, California
Public venues with a theatre organ